is a Japanese women's professional shogi player ranked 2-dan.

Women's shogi professional

Promotion history
Nakamura's promotion history is as follows:
 Women's Professional Apprentice League: 1997
 2-kyū: October 1, 2007
 1-kyū: March 30, 2009
 1-dan: March 14, 2013
 2-dan: August 2, 2021

Note: All ranks are women's professional ranks.

Personal life
Nakamura's brother Ryōsuke Nakamura is also a professional shogi player. The two are the second brother and sister pair in professional shogi history to become professionals.

References

External links
 ShogiHub: Nakamura, Momoko
 

Japanese shogi players
Living people
Women's professional shogi players
Professional shogi players from Saitama Prefecture
1987 births